Ascari was one of nineteen s built for the  (Royal Italian Navy) in the late 1930s and early 1940s. Completed in mid-1939, she was the last of the first batch of a dozen ships to enter service.

Design and description
The Soldati-class destroyers were slightly improved versions of the preceding . Their wartime complement during was 206 officers and enlisted men.

Ascari was powered by two Parsons geared steam turbines, each driving one propeller shaft using steam supplied by three Yarrow boilers.

Ascaris main battery consisted of four 50-caliber  guns in two twin-gun turrets, one each fore and aft of the superstructure. On a platform amidships was a 15-caliber 120-millimeter star shell gun. Anti-aircraft (AA) defense for the Soldatis was provided by eight  Breda Model 1935 guns. The ships were equipped with six  torpedo tubes in two triple mounts amidships. Although they were not provided with a sonar system for anti-submarine work, they were fitted with a pair of depth charge throwers. The ships could carry 48 mines.

Construction and career
Ascari, built at the OTO shipyard in Livorno, was laid down on 11 December 1937, launched on 31 July 1938 and completed on 6 May 1939. She was the last ship of the first (pre-war) group of the Soldati class to enter service.

On 11 June Ascari and her sister ships carried out a reconnaissance mission in the Sicilian Channel.

On 9 July 1940 Ascari and her division participated in the Battle of Calabria; in the final phase of the battle, the 12th Destroyer Division was ordered to attack the British Mediterranean Fleet with torpedoes. Ascari fired a torpedo at a British cruiser, but without success. Between late July and early August Ascari was among the escorts in a large convoy operation to Libya, Operation "T.V.L".

On 5 October Ascari and the rest of the DesDiv 12 sailed from Taranto as part of the escort of a convoy heading for the Dodecanese (Operation CV), but the operation was cancelled after British battleships were sighted by aerial reconnaissance in the eastern Mediterranean. On 26–27 November 1940, Ascari participated in the Battle of Cape Spartivento; during the battle, Lanciere was hit by a 6in shell from the cruiser HMS Manchester that left her dead in the water, and Ascari took her in tow and towed the crippled ship to Cagliari.

Between 26 and 29 March 1941 Ascari and the rest of her division escorted the 3rd Cruiser Division during the Battle of Cape Matapan.

Between March and September 1941 Ascari escorted a number of convoys between Italy and Libya.

On 23 September 1941 Ascari and sister ships laid a minefield off Malta, and on the following day they participated in a sortie by the 3rd and 8th Cruiser Divisions aimed at intercepting a British convoy, without success. On 13 December she joined a large convoy operation between Italy and Libya, "M. 41", which failed due to heavy attacks by aircraft and submarines. On 16 December Ascari took part in another large convoy operation to Libya, "M. 42", which was successful, despite a brief encounter with the escort of an Allied convoy to Malta, in an action known as the First Battle of Sirte.

Between January and March 1942 Ascari participated in the escorts of four more large convoy operations to Libya, "M. 43", "T. 18", "K. 7" and "V. 5", that were successful; the only loss during these operations was the troopship Victoria, sunk by Allied torpedo bombers on 24 January 1942. Ascari rescued survivors from the transport. On 21–22 March Ascari took part in the Second Battle of Sirte.

On 13–15 June 1942 Ascari, attached to the 10th Destroyer Division, participated in Operation Harpoon, attacking a British convoy to Malta together with the 7th Cruiser Division and 14th Destroyer Division. Researcher Francesco Matessini said that Ascari sank the drifting Burdwan with two torpedoes. Between late 1942 and early 1943, Ascari participated in a number of minelaying missions in the Sicilian Channel, as well as escort and troop transport missions between Italy and Tunisia.

At 7:18 on 24 March, Lanzerotto Malocello struck a mine laid by  about 28 miles north of Cape Bon and was left dead in the water. It was initially thought that the ship had been torpedoed, and Commander Mario Gerini, Ascaris commanding officer and also in command of the destroyer group, ordered Leone Pancaldo and Camicia Nera to proceed towards Tunis as he tried with Ascari to bring help to Lanzerotto Malocello, that sank about 90 minutes later. While rescuing Lanzerotto Malocellos survivors, however, Ascari hit in turn three mines, losing her bow and stern and finally sinking at 13:12, about 25 miles north of Zembretta. Some MAS boats sent from Bizerta and Pantelleria reached the scene after about four hours, and could only rescue 59 of the 533 troops and crew aboard Ascari. Commander Gerini was lost together with 193 of his crew and 280 German soldiers.

References

Bibliography

External links
 Ascari Marina Militare website

Soldati-class destroyers
Ships built in Livorno
Ships built by OTO Melara
1938 ships
World War II destroyers of Italy
Ships sunk by mines